Paolo Delle Piane (born 1 May 1964 in Bologna) is a retired Italian racing driver.

See also
Motorsport in Italy

References

1964 births
Living people
Italian racing drivers
International Formula 3000 drivers
Sportspeople from Bologna
20th-century Italian people